The 1932 Idaho gubernatorial election was held on November 8. Incumbent Democrat C. Ben Ross defeated Republican nominee Byron Defenbach with 61.73% of the vote.

Primary elections
Primary elections were held on May 24, 1932, the first in fourteen years.

Democratic primary

Candidate
C. Ben Ross, incumbent governor (unopposed)

Republican primary

Candidate
Byron Defenbach (unopposed)

General election

Candidates
Major party candidates
C. Ben Ross, Democratic
Byron Defenbach, Republican 

Other candidates
W. L. Steward, Liberty

Results

References

1932
Idaho
Gubernatorial